Edmund is an unincorporated community and census-designated place (CDP) in Lexington County, South Carolina, United States. It was first listed as a CDP in the 2020 census with a population of 969.

The CDP is in central Lexington County, centered on the junction of South Carolina Highways 6 and 302. Highway 6 leads north  to Lexington, the county seat, and southeast  to Swansea, while Highway 302 leads northeast  to West Columbia and southwest  to Pelion.

Demographics

2020 census

Note: the US Census treats Hispanic/Latino as an ethnic category. This table excludes Latinos from the racial categories and assigns them to a separate category. Hispanics/Latinos can be of any race.

References 

Census-designated places in Lexington County, South Carolina
Census-designated places in South Carolina